Ghouti Loukili (born July 1, 1973 in Tlemcen, Algeria) is an Algerian football player who is currently playing as a defender for MSP Batna in the Algerian Championnat National.

External links
 

1973 births
Algerian footballers
Algeria international footballers
Living people
People from Tlemcen
NA Hussein Dey players
WA Tlemcen players
USM Annaba players
MSP Batna players
ASM Oran players
US Biskra players
Algerian Ligue 2 players
MO Béjaïa players
Association football midfielders
21st-century Algerian people